Marin Mišković (born 5 February 1966) is a former Croatian handball player.

Honours
Zamet
Croatian First A League Vice-champions (1): 1992
Croatian First B League (1): 1995–96
Yugoslav Second League (1): 1986–87

Crikvenica
Croatian First B League Promotion (1): 2000–01

References

Yugoslav male handball players
Croatian male handball players
RK Crikvenica players
RK Zamet players
RK Zamet coaches
Handball players from Rijeka
Croatian expatriate sportspeople in Germany
Croatian expatriate sportspeople in Slovenia
1966 births
Living people
Croatian handball coaches